Olivier Marchal (born 14 November 1958) is a French actor, director, screenwriter, and a former policeman. In 2005, he was nominated for three César Awards (best director, best film and best writing) for his film 36 Quai des Orfèvres. He also created the popular French television police drama Braquo and wrote and directed some episodes in its first season (2009).

Personal life
With Catherine Quiniou (Catherine Marchal), actress, married in 1995, Olivier Marchal is the father of four children: Léa born in 1994, Zoé born in 1998, Ninon born in 2006 and Basile born in 2010. The couple separated in 2015.

Author

Filmography

Theater

References

External links 

 

1958 births
Living people
French film directors
French police officers
French male film actors
French male television actors
French male screenwriters
French screenwriters
People from Talence
20th-century French male actors
21st-century French male actors
French television directors
French film producers
French television producers